The National Bravery Awards are a set of awards given annually to about 25 Indian children below 18 years of age for "meritorious acts of bravery against all odds." The awards are given by the Government of India and the Indian Council for Child Welfare (ICCW). The award was instituted in 1957.

National  bravery award
 The Bharat Award
 The Geeta Chopra Award
 The Sanjay Chopra Award
 The Bapu Gaidhani Award
 The General National Bravery Awards

Origins
On Gandhi Jayanti day, 2nd October 1957, India's first prime minister, Jawaharlal Nehru, was watching a performance Delhi's Ramlila ground, at the Red Fort. During the performance, a short circuit caused a fire to break out in a shamiana (decorated tent).  Harish Chandra Mehra, a 14-year-old scout, promptly took out his knife and ripped open the burning tent, saving the lives of hundreds of trapped people. This incident inspired Nehru to ask the authorities to establish an award to honour brave children from all over the country. The first official National Bravery Awards were presented to Harish Chandra and one other child on 4 February 1958, by Prime Minister Nehru, and the ICCW ( Indian Council for Child Welfare) has continued the tradition ever since.
The Sanjay Chopra Award and the Geeta Chopra Award were established in 1978, in memory of two Chopra children who lost their lives while confronting their kidnappers. The Sanjay and Geeta awards are given to a boy and a girl for acts of bravery. The Bharat Award was established in 1987, and the Bapu Gaidhani Award was established in 1980.

In 2001, Scholastic published a commemorative book featuring the winners of the 1999 National Bravery Awards. The book was entitled Brave Hearts.

Selection process
Each year, the ICCW receives applications for the National Bravery Award. These applications come from official agencies such as local and district governments, school authorities, and councils for child welfare. The applications must be received by 30 September to be eligible for selection.

Awardees are selected by a committee constituted by the ICCW. This committee consists of representatives from leading government and non-government organizations, such as the secretariats of the president and the vice-president, the Central Social Welfare Board, the Indian Police, All India Radio, Doordarshan, the National Bal Bhavan,  SOS Children's Villages of India.

Ceremony
The awards are usually announced on 14 November, Children's Day, or in January the following year, and later presented by the prime minister on the eve of the Republic Day, and prior to this the President hosts a reception in their honour, where the children meet the media. On 26 January, the awardees take part in the Republic Day Parade at Rajpath, New Delhi.

List of awards

Bharat Award

Sanjay Chopra Award

Geeta Chopra Award

Bapu Gaidhani Award

Other recipients
1982: Ajmal Khan Gauhar (Bareilly, Uttar Pradesh)
1985: Abdhesh Kumar Gupta, (Etah, Uttar Pradesh).
1993: Prem Prakash Pathak, (lives in Delhi), native place: Gangolihat, District: Pithoragarh (Uttarakhand).
1993: M Pavitra 6 years (Bhopal Madhya Pradesh/Native K Keeranur, Oddanchatram Taluk/Settled at Chennai, Tamil Nadu). Youngest awardee.
1987: Vikas D. Satam (Vashi, Navi Mumbai, Maharashtra), Saurabh Oberoi (posthumous, Sri Ganganagar, Rajasthan) and Savottam Jeevan Raksha Padhak 1988; Shantanu Oberoi (Sri Ganganagar, Rajasthan, ICCW-Rajasthan 1988)
1990: Prashant Singh (Rewa, Madhya Pradesh), Prabhakar (Uttar Pradesh).
1994: Nilesh Umale, (12) (Vidarbha, Maharashtra)
1995: Shivshankar Madhukar Bidri killer earthquake 1993 two persons saved life
1997:  Nandan Kumar Jha, (15) (Adityapur, Jamshedpur, Jharkhand)
2000: Richa Tiwari,(Sagar, Madhya Pradesh) Saved her sister Mansi from drowning in a pond.
2001: Aakash Sabharwal (Delhi), Amrik Singh (Jammu & Kashmir) Ashwini Kamath, Andy Tenita Fernandes, Shruti Ullal, Sridevi Damodar, K.J. Kamaraju and Shilpa Satish Tamadaddi (Karnataka); Katta Trinadh and Putta Someshwar (Andhra Pradesh); Sanath (Kerala), Lalitha Devi Yadav, Mehul Sanyal (Bhopal), and Ritu Singh Tomar (Madhya Pradesh), Nijal Omprakash Patil, Narendra Shantaram Bithale, Sharvari Sudhir Mali, Mitali Khanapurkar of Maharashtra, Bhoopendra Singh Bainiwal (Rajasthan), Reshma Mohapatra from Orissa (posthumous), Nikhil (Posthumous), Lalmunsanga, Johny Lalnunfela (Mizoram).
 2002: Prithi Singh (10), Aparajit Singh (11), Swapnali Harishchandra Ghag (13), Rukaiya Begum (14), Nikky Maria Jacob (14), Jessamma George (16), Ashok Kumar Choudhary (18), Abdul Razak CM (16), Mumthaz TM (12), Balkrishna Upadhyay (17), Shreshthi Amrit Gorule (17), Naseer Khan (13) and Justin K Tom (19).
 2003: Chuneshwari Kothalis, Ramsadharan (Chhattisgarh), Nitin Uttamrao Kakde, Dyaneshwar Manikrao Kakade, Raju Namdev Kakde, Satyam Mahendra Khandekar, Skiewtidaris Lyngkhoi (Meghalaya), Pratap Vikubhai Khachar (Gujarat), Neelam Rani, Sarita Tyagi, Sunita Devi Sighdoya, Swati Tyagi, Sushma Rani (Haryana), G. Kranthi Kumar, Thotakura Mahesh (Andhra Pradesh) Ram Nayan Yadav (Uttar Pradesh), Harish Rana (Uttaranchal), Ajith Kumar P.T, Saneesh K.S, Suramya U.R. (Kerala).
 2004:Hotilal, Km Mahima Tiwari both from Uttar Pradesh, Master Ramandeep Singh and Master Pawan Kumar of Punjab (Joint Deed), Master RK Rahul Singh of Manipur, Km Shiney TA, Master Sajan Antony, Master TP Krishna Prasad and Master Johncy Samuel all from Kerala, Master Khiangdingliana of Mizoram, Km Priyanka of Haryana, Master Gopal Singh Sondia of Madhya Pradesh, Master B Sai Kushal of Andhra Pradesh and Master Vinod R. Jain of Karnataka.
 2005:Master Sarath sabu, Km. Divya TV, Late Master Shibu T (all from Kerala), Master Laxman (Chhattisgarh), Master Mukesh Kumar Tanwar (Madhya Pradesh), Master Puttijungshi (Nagaland), Master Nelson Karam, Km L. Pusparani Devi (both from Manipur), Master Nagarani Venkateswara Rao (Andhra Pradesh), Master Santosh Ramesh Dahe (Maharashtra).
2006: Master Aakash Saha (New Delhi), S/O Ravi Saha & Purnima Saha was awarded for helping and donating blood at the age of 15, was taken under custody for donating blood being a minor by Delhi Police however was applauded later and awarded by Dr A P J Abdul Kalam on Republic Day.
 2006: Km. Deepa Kumari, Master Sudhir Jakhar, Master Pawan Kumar Parashar, Master Rajender Kumar (all from Rajasthan), Kumari Anita Singh Lodh (Madhya Pradesh), Master David Kino (Arunachal Pradesh), Master Michael N.George (Delhi), Master Joel Salim Jacob (Kerala), Master Parth S Sutaria, Kum Antara Srivastava, Kum Ankita Ashok Bhosle (all from Maharashtra), Km. Paonam Babyrose Devi (Manipur), Km. Pooja Kabadwal (Uttaranchal), Master Rahul Chaurasia (Uttar Pradesh).
 2007: Master Raveendra Halder, Master Ravi Kumar Jhariya, Master Awadhesh Kumar Jhariya, Master Manas Nishad (all from Chhattisgarh), Master Vishnu C.S., Master Bijin Babu (both from Kerala), Master Kavvampalli Rajkumar, Master Pinjari Chinigi Sab (both from Andhra Pradesh), Km. Meher Legha (Noida, UP), Master Ankit Rai, Late Master Abhishake and Late Master Suraj (all from Haryana), Master Subhash Kumar (U.P.), Km. Congress Kanwar (Rajasthan) and Master Sunil Kumar P.N. (Karnataka).
 2008: Master Gagan J. Murthy, Km. Bhoomika J. Murthy (Karnataka), Km. Silver Kharbani (Meghalaya), Master Yumkhaibam Addison Singh (Manipur), Master Vishal Suryaji Patil (Maharashtra), Master Shahanshah (Uttar Pradesh), Km. Dinu K.G. (Kerala), Master M. Marudu Pandi (Tamil Nadu), Km. Anita Kora, Km. Rina Kora (West Bengal), Km. Manjusha A (Kerala), Km. Kritika Jhanwar (Rajasthan), Km. Hina Quereshi (Rajasthan), Master Manish Bansal (Haryana) and Master Rahul (New Delhi). For the first time, an award-winner's real name was withheld, as he identified the men who planted bombs on Barakhamba Road in New Delhi, during 13 September 2008 Delhi bombings, and helped police make sketches of the suspects.
 2009: Uddesh R. Ramnathkar (Goa); Zonunsanga and Lalrammawia (Mizoram); Sujith R., Amal Anthony, Krishnapriya K. and Sujith Kumar P. (all from Kerala); Dijekshon Syiem (Meghalaya); Thoi Thoi Khumanthem (Manipur); Vaishaliben Sambhubhai Solanki (Gujarat); Rekha Kalindi, Sunita Mahato and Afsana Khatun, (all from West Bengal); and Yogesh Kumar Jangid (Rajasthan).  
 2010:  Kalpana Sonowal and Rekhamoni Sonowal (Assam), Rahul Kurrey and Parvati Amlesh (Chhattisgarh), Anoop. M. and Raj Narayanan (Kerala), Rohit Maruti Mulik (Maharashtra), Md. Nurul Huda (Macnipur), Freedy Nongsiej and Lovelystar K. Sohphoh (Meghalaya), Lalmawizuali (Mizoram), Gurjeevan Singh (Punjab), Late Km. Chhampa Kanwar and Shrawan Kumar  (6yrs) (Rajasthan),  Bibek Sharma  (Sikkim),  Uttam Kumar (Uttar Pradesh), Late Km. Shruti Lodhi (Uttarakhand) and Sunita Murmu (West Bengal).
 2011: Yandam Amara Uday Kiran and Suthrapu Shiva Prasad (Andhra Pradesh), Ranjan Pradhan and Km. Sheetal Sadvi Saluja (Chhattisgarh), Km. Divyaben Mansangbhai Chauhan (Gujarat), Sandesh P Hegde and Km. Sindhushree B.A. (Karnataka), Mohammed Nishadh V.P., Anshif C.K. and Sahsad K (Kerala), Johnson Tourangbam and Kshetrimayum Rakesh Singh (Manipur), Late C. Lalduhawma (Mizoram), Km. Prasannta Shandilya (Orissa), Dungar Singh (Rajasthan), G. Parameswaran (Tamil Nadu), Late Km. Lovely Verma (Uttar Pradesh)  and Late Km. Saudhita Barman (West Bengal).
 2012: Ramdinthara (Mizoram, posthumous), Devansh Tiwari (Chhattisgarh), Mukesh Nishad (Chhattisgarh), Lalrinhlua (Mizoram), E. Suganthan (Tamil Nadu), Ramith.K, (Kerala), Mebin Cyriac (Kerala), Vishnu MV (Kerala), Koroungamba Kuman (Manipur, 7 yrs), Sameep Anil Pandit (Maharashtra), Viswendra Lohkna (Uttar Pradesh), Satendra Lohkana (Uttar Pradesh), Pawan Kumar Kanaujiya (Uttar Pradesh), Mahika Sharma (Assam) Stripleaseman Mylliem (Meghalaya), Sapna Kumari Meena (Rajasthan), Suhail KM (Karnataka).
 2015: Labhanshu Sharma (15) (Rishikesh, Uttarakhand)
1987:Naga Varaprasad Surikuchi (6) won National Bravery Award for saving his brother from drowning in a well. ('Bhimavaram, Andhrapradesh')

Note: Many others who have received these awards are not listed in this due to the unavailability of the complete information about them.

References

External links
 
 National Awards for Bravery, webpage at Indian Council for Child Welfare (ICCW)
 National Bravery Award ‘Govt. of India Portal.
 Special Feature: Meet India's Braveheart, a detailed profile of 19 awardees, of year 2004 Rediff.com
 Recipients of Bravery Awards 2012

Indian children
Civil awards and decorations of India
Awards established in 1957